|}

The Darley Stakes is a Group 3 flat horse race in Great Britain open to horses aged three years or older. It is run on the Rowley Mile at Newmarket over a distance of 1 mile and 1 furlong (1,811 metres), and it is scheduled to take place each year in October.

History
The event was established in 1987, but the inaugural running was abandoned because of high winds and structural damage. For a period the race held Listed status, and it was promoted to Group 3 level in 2003.

The Darley Stakes was formerly staged during Newmarket's Champions' Meeting in mid-October. It became part of a new fixture called Future Champions Day in 2011.

Records

Most successful horse:
 no horse has won this race more than once

Leading jockey (4 wins):
 Richard Hills – Fahris (1997), Haami (1998), Albarahin (2000), Tazeez (2010)

Leading trainer (3 wins):
 John Gosden – Susurration (1991), Tazeez (2010), Monarchs Glen (2017)
 Sir Michael Stoute – Desert Shot (1994), Stage Gift (2006)

Winners

See also
 Horse racing in Great Britain
 List of British flat horse races

References

 Racing Post:

 galopp-sieger.de – Darley Stakes.
 ifhaonline.org – International Federation of Horseracing Authorities – Darley Stakes (2019).
 pedigreequery.com – Darley Stakes – Newmarket.

Flat races in Great Britain
Newmarket Racecourse
Open mile category horse races
Recurring sporting events established in 1987
1987 establishments in England